Andrographis is a genus of flowering plants in the family Acanthaceae. They may be generally known as the false waterwillows, and several are called periyanagai.

The species are native to the Indian subcontinent (including Myanmar, Sri Lanka and the West Himalaya region). Many are endemic to India. They may be herbs or shrubs. They are introduced and/or cultivated in Southeast Asia and some areas around the Caribbean.

Some species are used medicinally. The best known is Andrographis paniculata, which is valued in Ayurveda, Unani, and Siddha medicine. It is used to treat a very long list of illnesses and conditions. A. alata and A. lineata are used in human and veterinary medicine. Food use has also been recorded.

It is currently (as of April 2021) accepted that there are 26 species in the genus. These are:

Andrographis affinis 
Andrographis alata 
Andrographis atropurpurea 
Andrographis beddomei 
Andrographis chendurunii 
Andrographis echioides 
Andrographis elongata 
Andrographis explicata 
Andrographis glandulosa 
Andrographis gracilis 
Andrographis lawsonii 
Andrographis lineata 
Andrographis lobelioides 
Andrographis longipedunculata 
Andrographis macrobotrys 
Andrographis megamalayana 
Andrographis neesiana 
Andrographis paniculata  - Indian subcontinent (native), SE Asia (cultivated)
Andrographis producta 
Andrographis rothii 
Andrographis rotundifolia 
Andrographis serpyllifolia 
Andrographis stellulata 
Andrographis stenophylla 
Andrographis subspathulata 
Andrographis viscosula

References

Acanthaceae
Acanthaceae genera